You Xigui (born May 1939) is a retired general in the People's Liberation Army of China. He was an alternate member of the 15th and 16th Central Committee of the Chinese Communist Party.

Biography
You was born in Ding County (now Dingzhou), Hebei, in May 1939. He served in the Central Guard Regiment from January 1958 to July 1983. In July 1983, he was assigned to the Central Guard Bureau of the General Office of the Chinese Communist Party, where he was promoted to deputy director in July 1985 and to director in August 1994.

He attained the rank of major general (shaojiang) in July 1990, lieutenant general (zhongjiang) in July 1997, and general (shangjiang) in June 2004.。

References

1939 births
Living people
People from Dingzhou
People's Liberation Army generals from Hebei
People's Republic of China politicians from Hebei
Chinese Communist Party politicians from Hebei
Alternate members of the 15th Central Committee of the Chinese Communist Party
Alternate members of the 16th Central Committee of the Chinese Communist Party